The Sangha forest robin (Stiphrornis erythrothorax sanghensis) is a subspecies of the forest robin that is endemic to south-western Central African Republic, but may also occur in adjacent parts of DR Congo, Cameroon and Republic of the Congo. It was only discovered in 1996, and scientifically described in 1999. When recognized as a species by IUCN, it was considered data deficient, but following recommendations by the BirdLife Taxonomic Working Group, IUCN now consider it a subspecies of the forest robin. It has been described as common. Clements includes this subspecies in the yellow-breasted forest robinspecies group, Stiphrornis mabirae.

References

A New Species of Robin
Forest Robin Stiphrornis erythrothorax

Stiphrornis
Birds described in 1999
Taxa named by Joel Cracraft